Jabor may refer to:

Personal names
Family name
 Arnaldo Jabor (1940–2022), Brazilian film-maker
 Baqir Jabr al-Zubeidi (b. 1946), sometimes known as Bayan Jabor, Iraqi politician
 Najla Jabor (1915–2001), Brazilian composer
 Ngah Jabor (1858–1921), also known as Mohammad Jabar bin Bardot and Imam Prang Jabor, prominent figure in the Malay Sultanate of Perak
Given name
 Jabor Al-Mutawa (b. 1994), Qatari tennis professional

Fictional characters
 a djinni in the Bartimaeus Sequence novels by Jonathan Stroud

Places
 Jabor (Marshall Islands)
 Jabur, also known as Jabor, a town in Terengganu, Malaysia